Alexis Genet (born 9 June 1982) is a French former professional footballer who played as a midfielder and defender. A product of Lyon's youth academy, he played for Le Havre, Bayonne, FC Saarbrücken, Sportfreunde Siegen, Saint-Priest, Monts d'Or Azergues, and Limonest in his senior career.

Personal life 
Alexis's father Guy is also a former footballer.

Honours 
Lyon B

 Championnat de France Amateur: 2002–03

References 

1982 births
Living people
Footballers from Nîmes
French footballers
Association football midfielders
Association football defenders
Olympique Lyonnais players
Le Havre AC players
Aviron Bayonnais FC players
1. FC Saarbrücken players
Sportfreunde Siegen players
AS Saint-Priest players
GOAL FC players

FC Limonest Dardilly Saint-Didier players
Championnat National 2 players
Ligue 2 players
Championnat National players
2. Bundesliga players
Regionalliga players
Championnat National 3 players
Division d'Honneur players